St. Mary's Street station is a surface light rail stop on the MBTA Green Line C branch, located just west of the intersection of Beacon Street and Park Drive in the northeastern tip of Brookline, Massachusetts. Like all surface stops on the line, St Mary's Street consists of two side platforms serving two tracks. The station is accessible.

With just over 1,500 daily boardings by a 2011 count, St. Mary's Street is the second-busiest stop on the C branch, behind only Coolidge Corner.

History

St. Mary's Street is the first outbound surface stop on the C branch. The line emerges from the Beacon Street tunnel at the St. Mary's Street portal, just east of the station. Until  was built in 1932, streetcars emerged from the Kenmore portal and ran down the median of Beacon Street from Kenmore Square.

In the early 2000s, the MBTA modified key surface stops with raised platforms for accessibility. Portable lifts were installed at St. Mary's Street around 2000 as a temporary measure. The renovation of St. Mary's Street - part of a $32 million modification of thirteen B, C, and E branch stations - was completed in 2003.

In 2007, the MBTA added a wooden mini-high platform on the outbound side, allowing level boarding on older Type 7 LRVs. These platforms were installed at eight Green Line stations in 2006–07 as part of the settlement of Joanne Daniels-Finegold, et al. v. MBTA. The ramp was removed in July 2020 during a track reconstruction project.

References

External links

MBTA - St. Marys Street
Station from Google Maps Street View

Green Line (MBTA) stations
Railway stations in Brookline, Massachusetts